General José Eduvigis Díaz is a town in the Ñeembucú department of Paraguay.

Sources 
World Gazeteer: Paraguay – World-Gazetteer.com

Populated places in the Ñeembucú Department